Events from the year 2015 in Macau, China.

Incumbents
 Chief Executive - Fernando Chui
 President of the Legislative Assembly - Ho Iat Seng

Events

March
 25 March - 9th Asian Film Awards at The Venetian Macao.
 31 March - Power outage hit Macau affecting 35 buildings and 4,200 households due to underground cable failure.

April
 15 April - Power outage hit Macau affecting 100,000 customers in one third of Macau Peninsula due to malfunction in Canal dos Patos substation.

July
 10 July - 2nd Macao Symposium on Biomedical Sciences by the Faculty of Health Sciences of University of Macau.

September
 3 September - 70th anniversary of Chinese Victory over Japan commemorative ceremony at Tap Seac Square.
 17–20 September - Men's Macau Open 2015.
 17–21 September - Women's Macau Open 2015.

October
 1 October - 66th National Day of the People's Republic of China ceremony at Macau Tower.
 27 October - The opening of Studio City in Cotai.

December
 17 December - The opening of St. Regis Macao in Cotai.

References

 
Years of the 21st century in Macau
Macau
Macau
2010s in Macau